The 2014 Women's Baseball World Cup was an international baseball competition being held in Miyazaki, Japan from 1 September – 7 September 2014.

Teams
The following 8 teams appeared at the tournament.

Round 1

Group A

Group B

Round 2
Results from Round 1 between teams from the same pool carry over

Group C

Group D

Round 3

7th-8th Place

5th-6th Place

Bronze Medal

Gold Medal

External links
 Official site

References

Women's Baseball World Cup
2010s in women's baseball
2014 in baseball
Women's Baseball World Cup, 2014
2014
Women's Baseball
Miyazaki (city)
Women's baseball in Japan